Rosemary's Baby may refer to:

 Rosemary's Baby (novel), a 1967 horror novel by Ira Levin
 Rosemary's Baby (film), a 1968 horror film based on the novel
 Rosemary's Baby (miniseries), a 2014 horror television miniseries based on the novel
 "Rosemary's Baby" (30 Rock), an episode of the television series 30 Rock